The 1997 Vuelta a España was the 52nd edition of the Grand Vuelta a España, one of cycling's Grand Tours. The Vuelta began in Lisbon on 6 September, and Stage 11 occurred on 16 September with a stage to Plasencia. The race finished in Madrid on 27 September.

Stage 1
6 September 1997 — Lisbon to Estoril,

Stage 2
7 September 1997 — Évora to Vilamoura,

Stage 3
8 September 1997 — Loulé to Huelva,

Stage 4
9 September 1997 — Huelva to Jerez de la Frontera,

Stage 5
10 September 1997 — Jerez de la Frontera to Málaga,

Stage 6
11 September 1997 — Málaga to Granada,

Stage 7
12 September 1997 — Guadix to Sierra Nevada,

Stage 8
13 September 1997 — Granada to Córdoba,

Stage 9
14 September 1997 — Córdoba to Córdoba,  (ITT)

Stage 10
15 September 1997 — Córdoba to Almendralejo,

Stage 11
16 September 1997 — Almendralejo to Plasencia,

References

1997 Vuelta a España
Vuelta a España stages